The Frank Senour Round Barn, also known as the Crandell Barn, is a round barn in the vicinity of Blackhawk, Vigo County, Indiana, about 13 miles south of Terre Haute.

For its agricultural and architectural significance, the barn was placed on the National Register of Historic Places in 1993 as part of a Round and Polygonal Barns of Indiana Multiple Listing.

History
The barn was built in 1905 by Frank Senour, who was impressed with the efficiency of similar barns in nearby Illinois. In 1922 a tornado damaged the barn's original cupola; the roof was patched but the cupola was not rebuilt.

Since 1972 the barn has been owned and maintained by the Crandell family.

Structure
The barn is a true circular barn with no angles in its circumference. It has red vertical siding and a conical roof with four small dormers. It was built in 1905 during a time when round barns were promoted as models of efficiency, since the circular shape has a greater volume-to-surface ratio than a square shaped barn. Farmers could also work in a continuous direction, saving time and labor.

References

Round barns in Indiana
Barns on the National Register of Historic Places in Indiana
Infrastructure completed in 1905
Buildings and structures in Vigo County, Indiana
National Register of Historic Places in Vigo County, Indiana
1905 establishments in Indiana